Lygephila is a genus of moths in the family Erebidae. The genus was erected by Gustaf Johan Billberg in 1820.

Species
 Lygephila alaica Remm, 1983
 Lygephila alikanga Strand, 1920
 Lygephila amasina (Staudinger, 1878)
 Lygephila angustipennis Warren, 1913
 Lygephila angustissima Draudt, 1950
 Lygephila bischofi Hacker & Fibiger, 2006
 Lygephila caeca Staudinger, 1896
 Lygephila camerounica Hayes, 1980
 Lygephila colorata Babics & Ronkay, 2009
 Lygephila craccae (Denis & Schiffermüller, 1775) – scarce blackneck
 Lygephila dorsigera Walker, 1865
 Lygephila dubatolovi Fibiger, Kononenko & Nilsson, 2008
 Lygephila exsiccata Lederer, 1855
 Lygephila fereidun Wiltshire, 1961
 Lygephila fonti Yela & Calle, 1990
 Lygephila glycyrrhizae Staudinger, 1871
 Lygephila homogyna Hampson, 1902
 Lygephila kazachkaratavika Stshetkin YuL & Stshetkin YuYu, 1994
 Lygephila kishidai Kinoshita, 1989
 Lygephila leucobasis Bethune-Baker, 1911
 Lygephila longicoecum Kononenko & Fibiger, 2008
 Lygephila lubrica Freyer, 1846
 Lygephila lubrosa (Staudinger, 1901)
 Lygephila lubrosa orbonaria Stshetkin YuL & Stshetkin YuYu, 1994 [1997]
 Lygephila ludrica Hübner, 1790
 Lygephila lupina Graeser, 1890
 Lygephila lusoria Linnaeus, 1758
 Lygephila maxima Bremer, 1861
 Lygephila minima Pekarsky, 2013
 Lygephila moellendorfi Herz, 1904
 Lygephila nigra Viette, 1954
 Lygephila nigricostata Graeser, 1890
 Lygephila ogatai Kinoshita & Sasaki, 1989
 Lygephila pallida Bang-Haas, 1907
 Lygephila pastinum Treitschke, 1826 – blackneck
 Lygephila plumbea Distant, 1898
 Lygephila procax Hübner, 1813
 Lygephila recta Bremer, 1864
 Lygephila salax  (Guenée, 1852)
 Lygephila schachti Behounek & Hacker, 1986
 Lygephila stueningi Kononenko & Fibiger, 2008
 Lygephila subpicata Wiltshire, 1971
 Lygephila subrecta Sugi, 1982
 Lygephila troberti Guenée, 1852
 Lygephila viciae Hübner, [1822]
 Lygephila vicioides Hampson, 1926
 Lygephila victoria Grote, 1874
 Lygephila violaceogrisea Draudt, 1950
 Lygephila vulcanea Butler, 1881
 Lygephila yoshimotoi Kinoshita, 1989

Former species
 Lygephila mirabilis Bryk, 1948

References
 Hacker, H. & Fibiger, M. (2006). "Updated list of Micronoctuidae, Noctuidae (s.l.), and Hyblaeidae species of Yemen, collected during three expeditions in 1996, 1998 and 2000, with comments and descriptions of species". Esperiana Buchreihe zur Entomologie. 12: 75-166.
 Hübner (1809-1813). Sammlung Europäischer Schmetterline 4: pl. 109: 510.
 Fibiger, M., Kononenko, V. S., & Nilsson, D. (2008). "Description of a new species of Lygephila Billberg, 1820 (Lepidoptera: Noctuidae, Catocalinae) from Russian Far East and North China". Zootaxa. 1922: 62–68.
 Pekarsky, O. (2013). "Taxonomic and morphological survey of the Lygephila lusoria (Linnaeus, 1758) species-group with description of a new species (Lepidoptera, Erebidae, Toxocampinae)". ZooKeys. 351: 49–81.
 
 
 
 Zootaxa 1876: 19.

Toxocampinae
Moth genera